In enzymology, a carboxyvinyl-carboxyphosphonate phosphorylmutase is an enzyme that catalyzes the chemical reaction

1-carboxyvinyl carboxyphosphonate  3-(hydrohydroxyphosphoryl)pyruvate + CO2

Hence, this enzyme has one substrate, 1-carboxyvinyl carboxyphosphonate, and two products, 3-(hydrohydroxyphosphoryl)pyruvate and CO2.

This enzyme belongs to the family of transferases, specifically those transferring non-standard substituted phosphate groups.  The systematic name of this enzyme class is 1-carboxyvinyl carboxyphosphonate phosphorylmutase (decarboxylating).

Structural studies 

As of late 2007, only one structure has been solved for this class of enzymes, with the PDB accession code .

References 

 
 

EC 2.7.8
Enzymes of known structure